Johnny Kreiger (20 April 1901 Rochester, New York – 3 May 1976 Van Nuys, California) was an American racecar driver.

Indy 500 results

References

Indianapolis 500 drivers
1901 births
1976 deaths
Sportspeople from Rochester, New York
Racing drivers from New York (state)